National Route 1 (N1) is a primary national route that forms part of the Philippine highway network, running from Luzon to Mindanao. Except for a  gap in Metro Manila and ferry connections, the highway is generally continuous. Most sections of N1 forms the Pan-Philippine Highway except for sections bypassed by expressways.

Route description
N1 follows a route that runs from Laoag in Ilocos Norte to Zamboanga City via Bicol Region, Eastern Visayas and eastern parts of Mindanao. The highway connects most major regional centers on its route and runs through different landscapes. The highway is mostly named Maharlika Highway, but other sections use different names.

Ilocos Region

N1 begins at the intersection with N2 (Manila North Road) and N100 (Laoag Airport Road) in Laoag as Manila North Road (MaNor). It then crosses Padsan River via Gilbert Bridge and enters the city proper of Laoag, where it splits before turning to the east in front of Ilocos Norte Provincial Capitol, briefly following J.P. Rizal Avenue before turning to General Segundo Avenue; both are principal city streets passing through the city proper and through its outskirts. Approaching Bacarra, it becomes a rural highway. At Bacarra, it bypasses the town center to the north and runs through a rural area, and then enters Pasuquin, where it serves as a major municipal street. Between Bacarra and Burgos, it becomes a rural two-lane highway and passes through interspersed barangays along the South China Sea (West Philippine Sea) coastline. It soon climbs the mountains upon approach to Burgos, where the highway directly serves the town. The highway zigzags through the rough terrain, and overlooks the beach where Bangui Wind Farm lies. It then passes through Bangui, where it runs as a major street on the town center, crosses Bulu River, and enters Pagudpud, which bypasses the town proper. N1 runs through the foothills that mark the edge of the Northern Luzon Cordillera and runs close to the coastline of Bashi Channel, where the highway zigzags through the cliffs through the Patapat Viaduct, a  viaduct that is required for the highway to pass the steep cliffs marking the northern edge of the Cordillera Range.

Cagayan Valley

Entering the Cagayan Valley region, N1 follows Manila North Road up to barangay Bangag, Aparri, where it turns south and becomes Bangag-Magapit Road up to the Magapit Interchange in Lal-lo. In Lal-lo, N1 is carried by the Magapit Suspension Bridge over the Cagayan River before meeting the Magapit Interchange. At the interchange, it turns southeast and becomes Cagayan Valley Road from Magapit, Lal-lo to Tuguegarao, running parallel to the Cagayan River. In Tuguegarao, N1 turns east at the roundabout intersection with N106 (Tuguegarao Diversion Road) and N51 (Santiago–Tuguegarao Road) to bypass the city proper towards Peñablanca and run parallel to the Cagayan River up to Reina Mercedes, Isabela. It then enters the province of Isabela and Nueva Vizcaya as Maharlika Highway, although it is alternatively called Cagayan Valley Road up to Guiguinto, Bulacan. It serves as the main artery of Isabela alongside N51. At Nueva Vizcaya, N1 runs parallel to and crosses the Magat River and traverses Dalton Pass, where Sierra Madre and Caraballo Sur meet.

Central Luzon

Nueva Ecija

The highway soon enters Nueva Ecija at Carranglan. It then descends to the plain terrain in San Jose as it approaches the poblacion. It then cuts through Muñoz and Talavera before turning east by its junction with N114 (Nueva Ecija–Pangasinan Road) in Santo Domingo. It then cuts through Talavera (once again, this time with the poblacion), Cabanatuan, Santa Rosa, San Leonardo and Gapan.

Bulacan

San Rafael to Guiguinto

The highway soon enters Bulacan at San Miguel, where it begins on a straight route. It then enters the poblacion of San Miguel, which it bypasses, and the highway begins to curve through most of its length between San Ildefonso and San Rafael, where the route runs through rice paddies. It closely follows a transmission corridor between the San Miguel-San Ildefonso boundary and San Rafael, and a Meralco subtransmission line uses the highway on that portion. Plaridel Bypass Road intersects with Doña Remedios Trinidad Highway just before approaching the poblacion of San Rafael. The highway curves to the southwest near Baliwag, where the highway is known as Doña Remedios Trinidad Highway (DRT Highway). It serves as a bypass of the old Cagayan Valley Road through Baliwag poblacion, with a flyover built on the intersection with Benigno S. Aquino Avenue (Baliwag–Candaba Road). At Pulilan, it serves as a principal route through the town center. At Guiguinto, it crosses the North Luzon Expressway (NLEX) along with the Santa Rita Interchange, where Asian Highway 26 leaves for the expressway. It soon crosses the original route of NLEX at Tabang Interchange.

Guiguinto to Meycauayan

Past Tabang Interchange, N1 begins to follow Manila North Road once again, this time as MacArthur Highway, which serves as a major toll-free highway over southern Bulacan. It soon crosses the Philippine National Railways right of way and enters Balagtas, where it directly passes through its poblacion. It soon crosses the Bigaa River, where it passes through residential and industrial areas, and curves upon entering Bocaue, where it bypasses the town center. A flyover restricted for use by light vehicles crosses Fortunato Halili Avenue to Santa Maria with service roads serving as frontage and heavy vehicle routes. The highway then curves, then, runs through the residential barangays of Bocaue and soon enters Marilao and Meycauayan.

Metro Manila

Valenzuela to Pasay

Entering Metro Manila, the highway follows MacArthur Highway over Valenzuela, which runs on a four to six-lane highway up to the Bonifacio Monument (Monumento) in Caloocan. There, the Asian Highway 26 concurrency returns on N1 as it turns east to follow Epifanio de los Santos Avenue (EDSA) up to Pasay. The whole road, bypassing the capital city of Manila, is notorious for congestion which causes delays as well as economic losses in the metropolis. EDSA runs through the central business districts of Metro Manila, most notably Araneta Center, Ortigas Center, and Makati Central Business District. The LRT Line 1 and MRT Line 3 utilizes the center island of EDSA on most segments between Caloocan and Pasay. N1 ends below the EDSA Flyover at N120/AH26/N61 (Roxas Boulevard) in Pasay.

A  gap in the highway is filled by the South Luzon Expressway and Skyway between Makati and Muntinlupa. It would have been filled by Taft Avenue Extension, starting from EDSA, going southwards via Quirino and Diego Cera Avenues and ends at Manila South Road below Alabang Viaduct through Alabang–Zapote Road.

Muntinlupa

N1 resumes below the Alabang Viaduct of South Luzon Expressway (SLEX/E2/AH26) in Alabang, Muntinlupa, where it intersects with SLEX's Alabang Exit, East Service Road, N411 (Alabang–Zapote Road), and N142 (Montillano Street). The highway assumes the name Maharlika Highway, Manila South Road, or locally, National Road. It runs as a commercial artery through the city up to the boundary with Laguna in San Pedro over the Tunasan River. However, this section does not assume the Asian Highway 26 concurrency, which is designated instead to South Luzon Expressway.

Calabarzon

San Pedro to Calamba

N1 generally serves as a four-lane toll-free highway serving the suburban cities of northwestern Laguna alongside the tolled South Luzon Expressway. Most sections of N1 between San Pedro and Calamba serve as commercial streets bypassing the old poblacions. Most of N1 is four-lane with a painted median divider.

It enters Laguna in San Pedro, where it serves as a major commercial street, with a maximum of four lanes. It then enters the cities of Biñan, Santa Rosa, Cabuyao, and Calamba, where it turns southwest at its intersection with N66 (Calamba–Pagsanjan Road) at the Calamba Crossing. In barangay Real, the highway is alternatively known as Real Road.

Calamba to Tayabas

N1 soon crosses the South Luzon Expressway at the Calamba Exit, where the concurrency with the Asian Highway 26 returns on the highway, and passes through several barangays in Calamba. It then enters the province of Batangas in Santo Tomas, where it intersects with STAR Tollway and bypasses the poblacion. At the roundabout intersection with N4 (Jose P. Laurel Highway) and Governor Carpio Avenue, it turns southeast towards San Pablo. It then re-enters the province of Laguna through Alaminos and then San Pablo, bypassing its poblacion. It then enters the province of Quezon at Tiaong, passing by the Villa Escudero plantations and going through the poblacion, followed by the municipalities of Candelaria and Sariaya and the city of Tayabas, where it turns southeast towards Lucena at the Calumpang Junction.

Tayabas to Pagbilao

From Tayabas through Lucena, N1 then follows the entire Lucena Diversion Road (also known as MSR Diversion Road), a wide road which bypasses the Old Manila South Road alignment through Lucena poblacion up to the road's eastern end in Pagbilao.

Pagbilao to Calauag

N1 enters Pagbilao, where it briefly splits into Recto Street for westbound and J.P. Rizal Street for eastbound at the poblacion. It then becomes alternatively known as New Diversion Road, the longer road bypassing the Old Zigzag Road alignment through the protected Quezon National Forest Park in the Sierra Madre mountain range. It enters Atimonan, where it then reaches the eastern coast of Quezon, and traverses the coastal municipalities of Plaridel, Gumaca, Lopez, and Calauag.

Bicol Region

Santa Elena to Sipocot

N1 enters Camarines Norte at the municipality of Santa Elena, meeting the N68 (Andaya Highway) that serves as a southern bypass of N1 which traverses the sparsely populated province of Camarines Norte. After traveling through kilometers of jungle, N1 enters the poblacion of Labo, Camarines Norte, where it follows local streets. It then becomes a rural highway again, passing by the municipalities of Vinzons and Talisay before bypassing Daet. It passes through Bicol Natural Park where the road winds through mountainous and hilly terrain. N1 enters Camarines Sur at the municipality of Sipocot, where it meets again N68 at its eastern end.

Sipocot to Matnog
From Sipocot, N1 traverses the municipalities of Libmanan, Pamplona, San Fernando, and Milaor (where it is alternatively known as Mabolo Road) in Camarines Sur before entering the City of Naga.  N1 enters Naga, bypassing its poblacion as Roxas Avenue or Diversion Road before turning east at the Naga Rotonda to follow Maharlika Highway to enter Pili, the provincial capital. It then traverses the municipalities of Bula, Baao, Nabua, and Bato.

N1 enters the province of Albay at Polangui and traverses south of the Mayon Volcano. At Daraga poblacion, N1 turns sharply to the west as it intersects with N630 (Rizal Avenue), which provides access to Legazpi City, and becomes a zigzag road as it leaves the province.

N1 enters the province of Sorsogon at Pilar. It then enters Sorsogon City, where it cuts through the poblacion as Rizal Avenue and Magsaysay Avenue, respectively. It turns east and traverses the municipalities of Casiguran, Juban, Irosin, and Matnog, where the Luzon section of N1 ends at the Port of Matnog. Motorists can board a ferry to either Allen or San Isidro in Northern Samar at the port.

Eastern Visayas

The Visayas section of N1 begins at the intersection with N670 (Allen–Catarman Road) and Allen Old Road in Allen, Northern Samar, just south of the Port of Allen. It runs along the western coast of Northern Samar and Samar, notably through the cities of Catbalogan and Calbayog. It then leaves the island of Samar and crosses the San Bernardino Strait through the San Juanico Bridge. It enters the province of Leyte at Tacloban, where it bypasses the poblacion. It then enters Palo and turns southwest at the intersection with N686, where a monument to an unknown soldier is located, towards the poblacion. At its intersection with N70/AH26 (Palo–Santa Fe Road) at the vicinity of the Palo Cathedral, it then turns southeast to the towns at the eastern coast of Leyte. At Abuyog, it climbs the mountain range and enters Mahaplag, where it meets N70 (Tacloban–Baybay Road). It enters Southern Leyte at Sogod, where Agas-Agas Bridge is located, and enters the coastal towns of Libagon and Liloan. In Liloan, N1 enters Panaon Island through the Wawa Bridge, and there, its Visayas section ends at its intersection with N691 and the road serving the Port of Liloan, where motorists can board a ferry to Surigao City.

Caraga Region 

The Mindanao section of N1 starts at the Port of Lipata in Surigao City. It enters Agusan del Norte and takes up the section Surigao-Butuan National Highway from Kitcharao to Ampayon, Butuan, where it turns southeast at its intersection with Butuan–Cagayan de Oro–Iligan Road (N9) to assume the name Davao-Agusan National Highway from thereon. It then enters Agusan del Sur, where it traverses near the Agusan Marsh Wildlife Sanctuary.

Davao Region 

N1 enters Davao de Oro (formerly Compostela Valley) at Monkayo and goes through mountainous terrain as it heads south towards Tagum in Davao del Norte. At the boundary of Tagum and Carmen, Davao del Norte, the highway briefly splits into two as it crosses the Libuganon River.

It enters Panabo and Davao City, where it is also known as Davao City-Panabo City Road and turns west at its intersection with N916 (R. Castillo Street) in Lanang as J.P. Laurel Avenue. It then runs through the city center of Davao, turns south, and becomes C.M. Recto Avenue, a one-way street carrying northbound traffic, past its intersection with N919 (Ramon Magsaysay Avenue). At the Bonifacio Rotunda, it turns northwest to Davao-Cotabato Road as A. Pichon Street (one-way carrying southeast-bound traffic), then southwest to Elpidio Quirino Avenue and becomes McArthur Highway at General Generoso Bridge I over Davao River, all through Davao City proper. It then enters Santa Cruz, Davao del Sur as it traverses its eastern coast.

It enters Digos, where it turns west at its intersection with N923 (Digos Diversion Road) and then south at its intersection with N75 to assume the name Digos-Makar Road, which is locally known as Rizal Avenue at the city's poblacion, up to General Santos.

Soccsksargen

N1 enters Sarangani at Malungon, where it runs parallel to Malungon River from there. At General Santos, it is locally known as Jose Catolico Sr. Avenue until turning west to pass by the poblacion. It turns north at its intersection with N935 (Hadano Avenue) at Hadano Park to assume the name Marbel-Makar Road, alternately known up to Polomolok as General Santos - Polomolok National Road, GenSan - Polomolok National Road, or Polomolok National Highway. At Koronadal poblacion, the highway turns southwest at its junction with N940 (Midsayap–Marbel Road) and Koronadal–Lutayan–Columbio Road and assumed the name Cotabato-Marbel Road up to Isulan. The highway veers northwest at Surallah and enters Sultan Kudarat at Isulan, where it becomes Marbel-Allah Valley-Cotabato Road.

Bangsamoro Autonomous Region

Ampatuan to Cotabato City
N1 enters Bangsamoro Region at Ampatuan, Maguindanao del Sur. It then enters Maguindanao del Norte at Sultan Sumagka (Talitay). It retains the name Marbel-Allah Valley-Cotabato Road up to Cotabato City. At the Cotabato City proper, the road assumes the local name Sinsuat Avenue.

Cotabato City to Picong

At the junction of Sinsuat, Quezon, and Don Teodoro V. Juliano Avenues, N1 turns east to assume the name Cotabato–Lanao Road up to Matanog, Maguindanao del Norte; its section from the junction to Sultan Kudarat, Maguindanao del Norte is also known as Quezon Avenue.

Entering Lanao del Sur at Sultan Dumalondong, N1 becomes Cotabato–Malabang–Lanao del Norte Road. In Balabagan, it assumes the alternate name Rizal Avenue as it approaches near the coast of Lanao del Sur with Celebes Sea up to Picong, the last municipality traversed by N1 before leaving Bangsamoro.

N1's section from Sultan Kudarat, Maguindanao to Balabagan, Lanao del Sur is also known as Narciso Ramos Highway.

Zamboanga Peninsula

At the end of the Bangsamoro section of AH26, N1 resumes at Lanao del Norte at Sultan Naga Dimaporo and approaches the southern coast of Lanao del Norte and Zamboanga del Sur. At Tukuran, it becomes alternatively known as Lanao-Pagadian-Zamboanga City Road and Pagadian City-Zamboanga City Road, respectively, from thereon. From the poblacion where it is locally known as Rizal Avenue, it climbs the mountainous terrain and turns west at its intersection with N9 (Butuan–Cagayan de Oro–Iligan Road) to become alternatively known as National Highway. It then cuts through Pagadian, where it is a principal route locally known as J.P. Rizal Avenue through the poblacion. It enters Zamboanga Sibugay, passing through the mountainous terrain and municipalities on the province's southern coast.

N1 enters Zamboanga City as Maria Clara L. Lobregat Highway. It then enters the city proper, where it turns south as Veterans Avenue at the Sta. Cruz Junction, then southwest as Governor Lim Avenue, which carries one-way northeast-bound traffic, and finally southwest as Don Pablo Lorenzo Street. It ends at the intersection with N970 (N.S. Valderosa Street), N966 (Zamboanga City-Labuan-Limpapa Road/J.S. Alano Street), and N971 (Wharf Road/Don Pablo Lorenzo Street), its physical continuation towards Port of Zamboanga.

History
The direct predecessors of N1 were Highway 3 (later Manila North Road) from Laoag to Aparri and from Guiguinto to Caloocan, majority of Cagayan Valley Road (Highway 5) from Lal-lo to Guiguinto, Highway 54 then in the province of Rizal, majority of Manila South Road (Highway 1) from Muntinlupa to Matnog, Samar-Leyte Road (Highway 1) from Calbayog to Santa Rita, Leyte-Samar Road (Highway 1) from Tacloban to Mahaplag and from Sogod, Southern Leyte to Liloan, Agusan-Davao Road, Davao-Cotabato Road (Highway 1) from Davao to Digos, Lanao-Cotabato Road (Highway 5) from Dadiangas (present-day General Santos) to Mamasapano, Cotabato-Lanao Road (Highway 1) from Sultan Kudarat to Malabang, and Lanao-Zamboanga Road. More roads were later constructed and added to altogether form the present alignment of N1 and Pan-Philippine Highway (also known as Maharlika Highway since 1979), which was conceived in 1965 as the country's principal transport backbone and later designated as Asian Highway 26 (AH26).

In 2014, Department of Public Works and Highways assigned MacArthur Highway from Guiguinto to Caloocan, EDSA, Manila South Road from Muntinlupa to Calamba, and the segment of Pan-Philippine Highway from Laoag to Guiguinto and from Calamba to Zamboanga City as N1.

Junctions

Luzon

Laoag to Pasay
Ilocos Norte
 in Laoag. Northern terminus of Laoag–Pasay section.
 in Bacarra

Cagayan
 in Abulug
 in Abulug
 at Magapit Interchange, Lal-lo
 in Tuguegarao
 in Tuguegarao
 in Tuguegarao
 in Tuguegarao

Isabela
 in Cabagan
 in Cauayan
 in Santiago
 in Cordon

Nueva Vizcaya
 in Bagabag
 in Aritao

Nueva Ecija
 in San Jose
 in Santo Domingo
 in Cabanatuan
 in Santa Rosa
 in Gapan

Bulacan

 in San Rafael
 in Pulilan
 in Plaridel
 in Santa Rita, Guiguinto. End of AH26 concurrency.
 in Tabang, Guiguinto
 in Meycauayan

Metro Manila
 in Malinta, Valenzuela
 in Karuhatan, Valenzuela
 in Caloocan. Start of AH26 concurrency.
 in Balintawak, Quezon City
 in Unang Sigaw, Quezon City 
 in Muñoz, Quezon City
 in Diliman, Quezon City
 in Diliman, Quezon City
 in Diliman, Quezon City
 in Cubao, Quezon City
 near Camp Aguinaldo, Quezon City
 in Quezon City and Mandaluyong
 in Mandaluyong
 in Makati  
 in Makati
 in Makati  
 at Magallanes Interchange, Makati
 in Pasay
 in Pasay
 in Pasay. Southern terminus of Laoag–Pasay section.

Muntinlupa to Matnog
Metro Manila
 in Alabang, Muntinlupa. Northern terminus of Muntinlupa–Matnog section. 
 in Alabang, Muntinlupa 
 in Alabang, Muntinlupa 

Laguna (1st segment)
 in Biñan
 in Santa Rosa
 in Calamba
 in Calamba. Start of AH26 concurrency.

Batangas
 in Santo Tomas
 in Santo Tomas

Laguna (2nd segment)
 in San Pablo (two southern termini)

Quezon
 in Tiaong (northern terminus)
 in Tiaong
 in Tiaong (southern terminus)
 in Candelaria (western & eastern termini)
 in Isabang, Tayabas
 in Isabang, Lucena
 in Gulang-Gulang, Lucena
 in Talipan, Pagbilao
 in Silangang Malicboy, Pagbilao
 in Gumaca
 in Lopez
 in Lopez

Camarines Norte
 in Santa Elena
 in Labo
 in Daet (northern & southern termini)

Camarines Sur
 in Sipocot
 in Pamplona
 in Pili
 in Pili
 in Pili
 in Baao
 in Nabua
 in Bato

Albay
 in Polangui (two northern termini)
 in Ligao
 in Ligao
 in Daraga

Sorsogon
 in Pilar
 in Castilla
 in Sorsogon City (western terminus)
 in Sorsogon City
 in Sorsogon City (eastern terminus)
 in Bulan

Visayas
Northern Samar
 in Allen. Northern terminus of Visayas section.

Samar
 in Calbayog
 in Calbayog
 in Gandara (northern & southern termini)
 in Catbalogan
 in Paranas
 in Basey
 in Santa Rita

Leyte
 in Tacloban
 in Tacloban
 in Palo
 in Palo (northern terminus)
 in Abuyog
 in Mahaplag (southern terminus)

Southern Leyte

 in Sogod
 in Liloan
 in Liloan. Southern terminus of Visayas section.

Mindanao
Surigao del Norte
 in Surigao City
 in Placer

Agusan del Norte
 in Butuan

Agusan del Sur
 in Prosperidad
 in Prosperidad
 in San Francisco
 in Trento

Davao de Oro
 in Montevista
 in Nabunturan

Davao del Norte
 in Tagum (northern terminus)
 in Tagum
 in Tagum (southern terminus)
 in Carmen
 in Panabo

Davao del Sur
 in Buhawan, Davao City (eastern terminus)
 in Buhangin, Davao City
 in Agdao, Davao City (eastern terminus)
 in Agdao, Davao City
 in Agdao & Buhangin, Davao City
 in Poblacion, Davao City
 in Poblacion, Davao City
 in Poblacion, Davao City
 in Talomo, Davao City
 in Talomo, Davao City (western terminus)
 in Talomo, Davao City (western terminus)
 in Talomo, Davao City
 in Digos (northern terminus)
 in Digos
 in Digos
 in Digos (southern terminus)
 in Sulop

South Cotabato
 in General Santos (eastern terminus)
 in General Santos
 in General Santos
 in General Santos

Sultan Kudarat
 in Tacurong
 in Isulan
 in Esperanza

Maguindanao del Sur
 in Datu Saudi Ampatuan

Maguindanao del Norte
 in Sultan Kudarat
 in Datu Odin Sinsuat
 in Datu Odin Sinsuat

Lanao del Sur
 in Malabang

Zamboanga del Sur
 in Tukuran

Zamboanga Sibugay
 in Ipil

Zamboanga City

. Southern terminus of Mindanao section.

References

Roads in Luzon
Roads in the Visayas
Roads in Mindanao